Monte Manos is a mountain of Lombardy, Italy. It has an elevation of 1,517 metres. It administratively belongs to the province of Brescia.

SOIUSA classification 
According to the SOIUSA (International Standardized Mountain Subdivision of the Alps) the mountain can be classified in the following way:
 main part = Eastern Alps
 major sector =  Southern Limestone Alps
 section = Brescia and Garda Prealps
 subsection = Prealpi Gardesane
 supergroup = Prealpi Gardesane Sud-occidentali
 group = Gruppo Tombea-Manos
 subgroup = Gruppo della Cima Tombea
 code = II/C-30.II-B.5.a

References

Mountains of the Alps
Mountains of Lombardy